Russell Allen (born 9 January 1954) is an English former footballer who played as a forward for West Bromwich Albion, Tranmere Rovers, Mansfield Town, and Boston United.

He was the son of England international striker Ronnie Allen.

Playing career
Allen, a former Arsenal apprentice, turned professional at West Bromwich Albion in 1971. He never played a First Division game for Don Howe's side, and was allowed to join Third Division side Tranmere Rovers in 1973, then managed by Ron Yeats. Rovers were relegated in 1974–75, but promoted straight out of the Fourth Division in 1975–76, under the stewardship of John King. Allen played 156 games for Tranmere, scoring 44 goals. He also played for Chicago Sting in the NASL.

Allen joined Mansfield Town in 1978, who had suffered relegation out of the Second Division in 1977–78. Narrowly avoiding the drop in 1978–79, the "Stags" finished four points short of safety in 1979–80, and Allen left the club after spending 1980–81 in the fourth tier. He played a total of 134 games for the club, scoring 21 goals. He moved on to Boston United of the Alliance Premier League.

Honours
with Tranmere Rovers
Football League Fourth Division fourth place promotion winner: 1975–76

References

1954 births
Living people
Sportspeople from Smethwick
English footballers
Association football forwards
West Bromwich Albion F.C. players
Tranmere Rovers F.C. players
Chicago Sting (NASL) players
Mansfield Town F.C. players
Boston United F.C. players
English Football League players
North American Soccer League (1968–1984) players
English expatriate footballers
Expatriate soccer players in the United States
English expatriate sportspeople in the United States